Chotomów  is a village in the administrative district of Gmina Jabłonna, within Legionowo County, Masovian Voivodeship, in east-central Poland.

The village has a population of 4,349.

References

www.chotomow.pl - Site of Chotomów
Forum of Chotomów
Życie Chotomowa - News from Chotomów
www.chotomow.eu - Site of Chotomów

Villages in Legionowo County